Dammaiguda formally known as Dammaigudem which earlier it was Hamlet Village in Nagaram Revenue Village then later burificated as a Separate Gram Panchayat. 
outer suburb of Hyderabad in Medchal-Malkajgiri district in Telangana, India. It falls under Keesara mandal.
It is a residential neighbourhood with a lot of independent houses and upcoming real-estate projects. . It comes under Jawaharnagar police station which is just 2 km from Dammaiguda Rajiv crossroad. it is one of the fastest developing areas in Hyderabad.

Kapra, Nagaram, Ahmadguda is neatest localities near this place.

Transport 
Dammaiguda is 15 km away from Secunderabad Railway station. There are several TSRTC buses from Secunderabad Railway Station to Dammaiguda such as 16D, 17D,15D, 37D, 24B/D, 16AD/5K, 16CD/5K, 24B/281, (frequency every 5 mins as on DECEMBER 2021)
Dammaiguda is 23km away from Afzalgunj.The TSRTC Buses available in this route are 3DN(frequency every 30mins as on DECEMBER 2021)
Dammaiguda is 14km away from Ghatkesar. The TSRTC Buses available in this route are 24L/281 (frequency every 30mins as on DECEMBER 2021)

References 
2.http://medchal.telangana.gov.in/mandals-villages/

Villages in Medchal–Malkajgiri district